Vidyasagar Mahavidyalaya, established in 1998, is an undergraduate college in Masat of Hooghly district, West Bengal, India. It is affiliated with the University of Calcutta.

Departments

Arts and Commerce
Bengali
English
History
Political Science
Education
Commerce

See also 
List of colleges affiliated to the University of Calcutta
Education in India
Education in West Bengal

References

External links
Vidyasagar Mahavidyalaya

Educational institutions established in 1998
University of Calcutta affiliates
Universities and colleges in Hooghly district
1998 establishments in West Bengal